West Santa Clara is an unincorporated census county division (CCD) located on the eastern side of the Santa Cruz Mountains in northwest Santa Clara County, California. The Foothills, Los Trancos, Monte Bello, Pearson-Arastradero, Picchetti Ranch, Rancho San Antonio and Saratoga Gap preserves are also located in the area.

As of the 2010 US Census, the population was 7,529 residents of whom 67.7% were non-Hispanic white, 22.8% Asian, 4.8% Hispanic, and 4.7% of other races, with a median age of 50.0 years old. As of 2009, the median income was $169,186 and median home price $1,527,451.

Most residents and businesses in the area use postal zip codes from neighboring cities of Palo Alto, Portola Valley, Los Altos Hills, Cupertino, and Saratoga. The telephone area codes are 408 (Santa Clara County), and 650 (overlaps with San Mateo County).

Climate

The region lies on the northeastern side of the Santa Cruz Mountains, and supports a relatively cool Mediterranean climate.

References

External links 
 Map of West Santa Clara, California

Unincorporated communities in Santa Clara County, California
Census county divisions in Santa Clara County, California
Unincorporated communities in California